Interpretations by the Stan Getz Quintet is an album by saxophonist Stan Getz recorded in 1953. It was the first 12-inch LP released on the Norgran label in 1954.

Reception
The Allmusic review awarded the album 3 stars.

Track listing
 "Love and the Weather" (Irving Berlin) - 6:32  
 "Spring Is Here" (Richard Rodgers, Lorenz Hart) - 6:07 
 "Pot Luck" (Johnny Mandel) - 3:55   
 "Willow Weep for Me" (Ann Ronell) - 5:22  
 "Crazy Rhythm" (Joseph Meyer, Roger Wolfe Kahn, Irving Caesar) - 5:53  
 "The Nearness of You" (Hoagy Carmichael, Ned Washington) - 3:43 
Recorded in Los Angeles, California on July 30, 1953 (tracks 1, 2 & 5), August 15, 1953 (track 4) and August 22, 1953 (tracks 3 & 6)

Personnel 
Stan Getz - tenor saxophone
Bob Brookmeyer - valve trombone  
John Williams - piano
Teddy Kotick - bass
Frank Isola - drums

References 

1954 albums
Stan Getz albums
Verve Records albums
Norgran Records albums
Albums produced by Norman Granz